Wotton is a town located in the province of Christ Church, Barbados. It is located about 10 km east of Bridgetown.

References 

Populated places in Barbados